Tapeats Creek is a creek located entirely within the Grand Canyon National Park. It flows southwest from its source near the North Rim of the canyon to the Colorado River at the base of the canyon. It was named by the Second Powell Expedition in the winter of 1871–1872 for a Southern Paiute Indian who claimed ownership of the stream. It contributes the largest amount of water to the Colorado of any tributary on the north side within the Grand Canyon.

Sources
The creek is fed from Tapeats Spring, the largest Spring in the Grand Canyon. In 1970, the spring was estimated to discharge  of water per day into the creek from the Muav Limestone. A small amount of surface water can also flow into the creek. Since the spring flows year round, the creek is a perennial stream.

Tributaries
The river, the steepest and one of the shortest in the United States, ends at the bottom of a waterfall where it joins Tapeats Creek.

Environment
Common trees along the creek are tamarisk and willows, with equisetum, mimulus, and cress found along the banks. Algae-covered rocks are found in most of the creek.  Common aquatic invertebrate found in the creek include mayflies, different types of caddisflies, flies and riffle beetles. Bladder snails, isopods and damselflies can also be found.

Fishing
The creek is considered one of Arizona's best wild-trout streams. The creek can be reached by Thunder River Trail from the North Rim, which is only accessible from mid-May to late October.
Alternatively, the creek can be reached by raft trip on the Colorado River. Rainbow trout are plentiful and average  and can reach .

Related
The following geologic features are located in the vicinity and are named after the creek:
the Tapeats Sandstone, which is exposed above the creek
the Tapeats Rapids in the Colorado, located where the creek enters the river
Tapeats Amphitheater, a large basin containing the creek's headwaters
Tapeats Terrace, a terrace with wide low benches
Tapeats Spring, the natural spring that feeds the creek

Notes

References

Rivers of Arizona
Tributaries of the Colorado River in Arizona
Rivers of Coconino County, Arizona
Grand Canyon, North Rim

Grand Canyon, North Rim (west)